Kamala Kamesh is an Indian actress in Tamil movies. She was one of the prominent supporting actress in late 1960s, 1970s and 1980s in Tamil movies. She has acted nearly 480 movies in Tamil. She is often seen in all of Visu's movies.

Biography
She is married to Kamesh, a Tamil music director in 1974. Her only daughter Uma Riyaz Khan was born in 1975. She is also an actress in Tamil movies. Kamala husband Kamesh died in 1984.
Malayalam-Tamil actor Riyaz Khan is her son-in-law.

Partial filmography

Tamil
{| class="wikitable"
|+
!Year
!Film
!Role
!Notes
|-
| rowspan="2" |1981
|Alaigal Oivathillai
|Vichu's mother
|
|-
|Kudumbam Oru Kadambam
|Lakshmiammal
|
|-
| rowspan="8" |1982
|Manal Kayiru
|Uma's mother
|
|-
|Simla Special 
|Babu's mother
|
|-
|Moondru Mugam 
|Sagaya Mary
|
|-
|Punitha Malar 
|
|
|-
|Gopurangal Saivathillai
|
|
|-
|Agaya Gangai
|Aandal
|
|-
|Mamiyara Marumagala
|
|
|-
|Enkeyo Ketta Kural
|
|
|-
|1983
|Bhagavathipuram Railway Gate
|
|
|-
|1984
|Naan Paadum Paadal
|
|
|-
|1985
|Navagraha Nayagi
|
|
|-
|1985
|Iravu Pookkal
|Mother
|
|-

| rowspan="6" |1986
|Kadalora Kavithaigal
|Thayamma
|
|-
|Samsaram Adhu Minsaram
|Godavari
|
|-
|Mella Thirandhathu Kadhavu
|Meenakshi
|
|-
|Oru Iniya Udhayam
|Thavudu's mother
|
|-
|Palaivana Rojakkal
|
|
|-
|Dharmam
|
|
|-
| rowspan="6" |1987
|Kadamai Kanniyam Kattupaadu
|
|
|-
|Mangai Oru Gangai
|
|
|-
|Ore Oru Gramathiley
|
|
|-

|Idhu Oru Thodar Kathai
|
|
|-
|Sattam Oru Vilayaattu
|Nair's wife
|
|-
|Koottu Puzhukkal
|
|
|-
|1988
|Katha Nayagan
|
|
|-
|1988
|Penmani Aval Kanmani
|Kamala
|
|-
|1988
|Ullathil Nalla Ullam
|
|
|-
| rowspan="4" |1990
|Pulan Visaranai
|Vasantha Gopalan's mother
|
|-
|Pondatti Thevai
|Kamala
|
|-
|Athisaya Piravi
|
|
|-
|Paattali Magan
|
|
|-
| rowspan="3" |1991
|Thangamana Thangachi
|Meenakshi
|
|-
|Kaaval Nilayam
|Murali's mother
|
|-
|Rudhra
|
|
|-
| rowspan="4" |1992
|Chinna Gounder
|
|
|-
|Idhuthanda Sattam
|
|
|-
|David Uncle
|
|
|-
|Thirumathi Palanisamy
|
|
|-
|1993
|Aadhityan
|
|
|-
|1993
|Chinna Kannamma
|Gayatri's mother
|
|-
|1994
|Jaihind
|
|
|-
|1994
|Pudhiya Mannargal'
|
|
|-
|1995
|Chandralekha|Chandralekha's aunt
|
|-

|1995
|Mannai Thottu Kumbidanum|
|
|-
|1995
|Mogamul|Ranganna's wife 
|
|-
|1996
|Anthimanthaarai|
|
|-
|2001
|Aandan Adimai|
|
|-
|2004
|Vishwa Thulasi|
|
|-
|2007
|En Uyirinum Melana|
|
|-
|2022
|Veetla Vishesham|Jenny Aunty
|
|}

Kannada
 Khadeema Kallaru (1982)
 Premayuddha (1983)
 Ananda Sagara(1983)
 Male Banthu Male(1984)
 Guru Jagadguru (1985)
 Brahma Gantu (1985)
 Chaduranga (1985)
 Prema Pareekshe 1991

MalayalamVelicham Vitharunna Penkutty (1982)Rugma (1983)Oru Sandesam Koodi (1985)Dheem Tharikida Thom (1986)Aalorungi Arangorungi (1986)Veendum Lisa (1987)Amrutham Gamaya (1987)Asthikal Pookkunnu (1989)Ulsavapittennu (1989)Ivalente Kaamuki (Manmadhan) (1989)Avan Ananthapadmanaabhan (1994)

Telugu
 Jaitra Yatra'' (1991)

Television
Mangalyam (Tamil TV Serial)
Anandha Bhavan

References

External links

 Kamala Kamesh profile
Kamala Kamesh at MSI

Actresses in Malayalam cinema
Actresses in Tamil cinema
Actresses in Telugu cinema
Indian film actresses
Actresses in Kannada cinema
Living people
Actresses from Kochi
20th-century Indian actresses
21st-century Indian actresses
1952 births
Actresses in Tamil television